Henrik Törnqvist (born August 25, 1996) is a Swedish professional ice hockey player. He is currently playing with Linköping HC of the Swedish Hockey League (SHL).

Playing career
Törnqvist made his Swedish Hockey League debut playing with Linköping HC during the 2014–15 SHL season.

In the 2018–19 season, Törnqvist joined Timrå IK, and made 51 appearances, scoring a career best 9 goals, 23 assists for 32 points. Unable to prevent Timrå IK from relegation, Törnqvist returned for a third stint with original club, Linköping HC, securing a three-year contract on 21 April 2019.

References

External links

1996 births
Living people
Karlskrona HK players
Linköping HC players
Swedish ice hockey right wingers
Timrå IK players
People from Motala Municipality
Sportspeople from Östergötland County